The 1997–98 Michigan Wolverines men's basketball team represented the University of Michigan in intercollegiate college basketball during the 1997–98 season. The team played its home games in the Crisler Arena in Ann Arbor, Michigan, and was a member of the Big Ten Conference.  Under the direction of head coach Brian Ellerbe, the team finished fourth in the Big Ten Conference.  The team emerged victorious in the inaugural 1998 Big Ten Conference men's basketball tournament.  The team earned an invitation to the 1998 NCAA Division I men's basketball tournament as a number three seed where it was eliminated in the second round. The team was ranked for twelve of the eighteen weeks of Associated Press Top Twenty-Five Poll, starting the season unranked, peaking at number twelve where it ended the season, and it also ended the season ranked twelve in the final USA Today/CNN Poll.  The team had a 4–3 December 13, 1997, against #1 Duke 81–73 at home, December 26, 1997, against #19 Syracuse 93–61 at the Puerto Rico Holiday Classic, Eugene Guerra Sports Complex in San Juan, Puerto Rico, February 1 against #16 Iowa 80–66 on the road, March 8 against #9 Purdue 76–67 at the 1998 Big Ten Conference men's basketball tournament at the United Center. The victory over Duke was one of only two victories over the number one ranked team in the country in the history of the school.

Robert Traylor and Travis Conlan served as team co-captains, while Robert Traylor and Louis Bullock shared team MVP honors.  The team's leading scorers were Louis Bullock (580 points), Robert Traylor (552 points) and Jerod Ward (445 points).  The leading rebounders were Traylor  (347), Maceo Baston (227), and Jerod Ward (206).

Bullock led the Big Ten Conference in three-point field goals made in conference games (51) and all games (93).  He also led the conference in three-point field goal percentage in conference games (48.1%) and free throw percentage in all games (91.1%).  The team led the Big Ten Conference in three-point field goals made in conference games (121) and three-point field goal percentage (40.1%).

Maceo Baston ended his career with the current Michigan record for career field goal percentage, with a 62.72%, surpassing the 61.70% mark set by Loy Vaught in 1990. On February 22, 1998, against Indiana, the team made 15 three-point field goals, establishing a new school single-game record that would last until December 13, 2008.  The team also broke the single-season three-point shot record of 203 set the prior year by making 260, which was a record that would last until 2009.

In the 1998 Big Ten Conference men's basketball tournament at the United Center from March 5–8, Michigan was seeded fourth and earned a first round bye.  In the second round, they defeated number five Iowa 77–66.  In the semifinals, they defeated number eight  85–69.  In the championship game, they defeated number three Purdue 76–67.

Due to the Michigan basketball scandal, Michigan has vacated the records from this season.

Rankings

Team players drafted into the NBA
Three players from this team were selected in the NBA draft.

See also
1998 NCAA Division I men's basketball tournament
List of vacated and forfeited games in college basketball
University of Michigan basketball scandal

References

Michigan Wolverines men's basketball seasons
Michigan
Michigan
Michigan
Michigan
Big Ten men's basketball tournament championship seasons